WESA may refer to:

 WESA (FM), public radio station based in Pittsburgh, Pennsylvania
 WFGI (AM), The radio station that was previously known as WESA in Charleroi, Pennsylvania
 Wapeneienaars van Suid-Afrika, Gun Owners of South Africa
 World eSports Association
 Wills, Estates And Succession Act of British Columbia

See also
 Wesa, Pashto surname